The Battle of Midway is a 1942 American short documentary film directed by John Ford. It is a montage of color footage of the Battle of Midway with voice overs of various narrators, including Johnny Governali, Donald Crisp, Henry Fonda, and Jane Darwell.

Plot
The film begins with a male narrator (Donald Crisp) explaining where Midway Island is and its strategic importance. About five minutes into the film the format changes somewhat, with more leisurely pictures of the G.I.s at work on the island, and then a female voice over. The female voice over (Jane Darwell) takes the personality of a middle aged woman from Springfield, Ohio, who is a mother-type figure pointing out how she recognizes a boy from her home town. The boy is Army Air Force pilot William E. "Junior" Kinney. Then stock footage of the Kinney family back home is introduced.

Abruptly the narrative (spoken by Henry Fonda) turns to the battle itself with approximately five minutes dedicated to the defense of the island, the naval battle, and the aftermath. At the end the various known Japanese losses are shown (four aircraft carriers, as well as battleships, aircraft, and men) and then brushed over with red or black paint.

Production notes
When the United States Navy sent director John Ford to Midway Island in 1942, he believed that the military wanted him to make a documentary on life at a small, isolated military base, and filmed casual footage of the sailors and Marines there working and having fun. Two days before the battle, he learned that the Japanese planned to attack the base and that it was preparing to defend itself. Ford's handheld, 16mm footage of the battle was captured totally impromptu. He had been in transit on the island, roused from his bunk by the sounds of the battle, and started filming. Ford was wounded by enemy fire while filming the battle. Acclaimed as a hero when he returned home because of the footage and the minor wound, Ford decades later incorrectly claimed to Peter Bogdanovich that he was the only cameraman; however, Jack Mackenzie Jr. and Kenneth Pier assisted Ford in filming.

Ford was worried that military censors would prevent the footage from being shown in public. After returning to Los Angeles, he gave the footage to Robert Parrish, who had worked with him on How Green Was My Valley, to edit in secret. Ford spliced in footage of James Roosevelt, President Franklin D. Roosevelt's son and a Marine Corps officer; when the president saw the film in the White House, he told William Leahy: "I want every mother in America to see this film", thus protecting Ford from censorship. Parrish wrote an in-depth account of the making of The Battle of Midway in his autobiography, Growing Up in Hollywood (1976). The film runs for 18 minutes, was distributed by 20th Century Fox, and was one of four winners of the inaugural, 1942 Academy Award for Best Documentary.

Seeing men he had met and filmed die horrified Ford, who said, "I am really a coward" compared to those who fought. He had spent time with Torpedo Squadron 8, and 29 of 30 men of the unit died or were missing after the battle. Ford assembled the footage he had taken of the squadron into an eight-minute film, adding titles praising the squadron for having "written the most brilliant pages in the glowing history of our Naval Air Forces" and identifying each man as he appeared. He printed the result, Torpedo Squadron 8, to 8mm film suitable for home projectors and sent copies to the men's families.

Archive
The Academy Film Archive preserved The Battle of Midway in 2006. The film is part of the Academy War Film Collection, one of the largest collections of World War II era short films held outside government archives.

Gallery

See also
 List of American films of 1942
 List of Allied Propaganda Films of World War 2
 Midway

References

External links
 
  
 
The Battle of Midway at the National Archives and Records Administration
 
 Reel America: The Battle of Midway and John Ford on C-SPAN (June 8, 2014)

1942 short films
American World War II propaganda shorts
Films about the Battle of Midway
Best Documentary Feature Academy Award winners
American black-and-white films
Documentary films about military aviation
Films directed by John Ford
Films scored by Alfred Newman
World War II aviation films
Films with screenplays by Dudley Nichols
American short documentary films
1942 documentary films
20th Century Fox short films
1940s English-language films